Re Lipinski's Will Trusts [1976] Ch 235 is an English trusts law case, concerning the policy of the "beneficiary principle" and unincorporated associations.

Facts
Mr Harry Lipinski, who was active in the Hull Jewish community, gave the residual part of his estate ‘as to one half thereof for the Hull Judeans (Maccabi) Association in memory of his late wife to be used solely in the work of constructing the new buildings for the association and/or improvements to the said buildings’. The other half was one quarter for the Hull Hebrew School (Talmud Torah), and one quarter for the Hull Hebrew Board of Guardians. The next of kin challenged these provisions, questioning whether the gift to the association would not be void.

Judgment
Oliver J held that the bequest was to the association absolutely, so in fact they did not need to use it for buildings (only constrained by the contract). The purpose was within the association's power to do, and it would be up to them to honour it.

Oliver J also remarked upon Re Denley as a Re Bowes type of case, where a purpose is disregarded, while saying it was ‘both with authority and with common sense’.

See also

English trusts law

Notes

References

English trusts case law
High Court of Justice cases
1976 in case law
1976 in British law